Dmytro Oleksandrovych Nalotov (born 28 April 1985) is a Ukrainian politician currently serving as a People's Deputy of Ukraine representing Ukraine's 144th electoral district from Servant of the People since 2019.

Early life and career 
Dmytro Oleksandrovych Nalotov was born on 28 April 1985 in the city of Poltava, in central Ukraine.

Nalotov has founded several non-governmental organisations and companies, and from 2004 to 2009 was also a snowboarding instructor at the Dragobrat ski resort. From 2006 to 2011, he was head of the Urban BoardShop company in Poltava, and from 2010 to 2015 he was owner of SnowLab Gudauri, a Georgia-based company. Prior to his election, Nalotov was active in the theme parks industry both in Georgia and in Kyiv, Ukraine's capital.

Political career 
During the 2019 Ukrainian parliamentary election, Nalotov ran as the candidate of Servant of the People for People's Deputy of Ukraine in Ukraine's 144th electoral district. At the time of the election, he was an independent. Nalotov was successfully elected, winning with 41.97% of the vote and defeating Poltava mayor  and incumbent People's Deputy Serhiy Kaplin (both independent).

In the Verkhovna Rada (national parliament of Ukraine), Nalotov joined the Servant of the People faction, as well as the Verkhovna Rada Committee on Humanitarian and Informational Policy. According to an analysis by anti-corruption non-governmental organisation Chesno, Nalotov, alongside fellow Servant of the People deputy Anatoliy Bobliakh, voted the most in favour of government proposals in 2019. At the same time, he abstained from 34% of votes.

References 

1985 births
Living people
Ninth convocation members of the Verkhovna Rada
Politicians from Poltava
Servant of the People (political party) politicians
People from Poltava